ISSA School of Management Assistants was founded in 1963 as the Superior Institute of Secretarial and Administrative Studies. It is part of the University of Navarra and one of the most prestigious academic centers in Spain and the world dedicated to the training of elite Management Assistants, many of whom go on to work at the most prestigious Spanish companies.  It had been located in San Sebastián since its foundation in 1963, but it is currently located in Pamplona. ISSA has always been the number-one Spanish educational institution to train Management Assistants at university level.

Since its inception, over 3,000 of its graduates have gone on to work at such firms as Disney, L'Oréal, Heinz, Terra, Disney Channel, Gamesa, Retevisión, Atresmedia, Altadis, Nissan, Volkswagen, Microsoft and others.

ISSA was housed for 50 years in San Sebastián in an opulent building constructed by a Spanish aristocrat as his summerhouse in 1900.  It was thus decorated with exquisite tapestries and carpets, computers, and state-of-the-art technology (Source).

The faculty in currently located in Pamplona in the Amigos' building, sited in the main Campus of the University of Navarra )consists of 27 instructors, each having at least a bachelors or doctorate degree. It offers the Bachelor's Degree in Management Assistance (Source), a degree that combines Business and Modern Languages.

External links
 Official webpage

University of Navarra